The following is a list of National Collegiate Athletic Association (NCAA) Division I college golf team statistics and records through the 2018 NCAA Division I Men's Golf Championship. The NCAA began sponsoring the national collegiate championship in 1939. Before that year the event was conducted by the National Intercollegiate Golf Association.

Tournament match play records, since 2009

Team records
through 2017

Most consecutive team appearances, NCAA Regionals: 26
Oklahoma State (1989–2014)
Most consecutive team appearances, NCAA Championships: 65
Oklahoma State (1947–2011)
Best team score (in relation to par), two rounds: 553 (−23)
UNLV, 1998 (Chris Berry–138, Bill Lunde–138, Charley Hoffman–138, Jeremy Anderson–139, Scott Lander–143)
Best team score (in relation to par), three rounds: 824 (−16)
California, 2013 (Max Homa–201, Brandon Hagy–205, Michael Kim–212, Michael Weaver–214)
Best team score (in relation to par), four rounds: 1,116 (−36)
Oklahoma State, 2000 (Charles Howell III–265, Landry Mahan–281, Andres Hultman–288, Edward Loar–288, J. C. DeLeon–295)
Georgia Tech, 2000 (Matt Weibring–276, Carlton Forrester–282, Bryce Molder–282, Matt Kuchar–283, Troy Matteson–285)
Greatest margin of victory, strokes: 33
Wake Forest, 1975

References

External links 
NCAA Men's Golf

College golf in the United States
Golf records and rankings